Ende Gelände 2016 was a large civil disobedience protest movement in Germany to limit global warming through fossil fuel phase-out.

– environmental activists from twelve countries blocked the Welzow-Süd open-pit coal mine and the coal-fired Schwarze Pumpe power station, then owned by Vattenfall (Spremberg), from 13 to 15 May 2016.

Context 
On 15 August 2015, in the first year of Ende Gelände,  activists blocked the Garzweiler surface mine owned by RWE (Ende Gelände 2015).

Ende Gelände formed in 2015 as a coalition of German environmental groups and "people from the anti-nuclear and anti-coal movements".

The activists of the first Ende Gelände 2015 were hosted by the climate camp "Rheinlandcamp".

In German, Ende Gelände idiomatically means "Here and no further". Ende Gelände 2016 was part of an international wave of actions called "Break Free from Fossil Fuels".

It was followed by Ende Gelände 2017: in the Rhineland open-pit mines on 24 to 29 August 2017 as well as 3 to 5 November 2017 on (for the 2017 United Nations Climate Change Conference).

Description 
During the 48 hours of mass action, the coal-fired Schwarze Pumpe power station (described as "Europe's tenth largest emitter of ") was cut to 20 percent of its power for two days.

The nearly shutting down of the power plant over the weekend of Ende Gelände was seen by activists as a great success. Vattenfall Europe's chairman of the board said: "It is an absolute new quality, that a power plant shall be forced to cease its work by violent pressure, which has direct consequences for the German electricity grid. This does not any more only affect Lusatia."

The short-term goal of Ende Gelände was to stop the process of Vattenfall selling the mining area. The selling of Lusatia's coal mining industry was described by Ende Gelände as the biggest single investment in coal power in Europe. Ende Gelände intended to stop the selling process. Instead, Vattenfall should have, according to Ende Gelände, financed a social coal phase out and cover ecological follow up expenditures.

The mining region was eventually, after renewed debates in the Swedish Parliament as a direct response to Ende Gelände, sold to EPH in October 2016. Vattenfall initially expected to sell for 2 to 3 billion Euro, but finally had to pay EPH 1.7 billion for EPH taking over all (especially ecological) liabilities in the region. Ende Gelände had the motto in 2016 "we are the investment risk".

Organisers describes Ende Gelände 2016 as "the largest ever global civil disobedience against fossil fuels".

Gallery

See also 
 Climate disobedience
 Climate justice
 Energy transition (in Germany)
 Ende Gelände
 
 Ende Gelände 2017
 Extinction Rebellion
 Fossil fuel divestment

References

External links 

 Official website

2016 in Germany
2016 in the environment
2016 protests
Climate change in Germany
Climate change policy
Coal mining
Coal in Germany
Demonstrations
Direct action
Environmental protests in Germany
Mining in Germany
Occupations (protest)
Spremberg
Vattenfall
Surface mining
foo